The champions league round was the next stage from the regional stage of 2017 Thai League 4. Winners and runners-up of each region would qualified to this round to finding 5 clubs promoting to 2018 Thai League 3.

Teams
League positions of the regional stage shown in parentheses.

Note:

Stadium and locations

13 clubs from all around Thailand would compete in the champions league round. 2 clubs Chiangrai City runners-up from Northern and Phuket 
runners-up from Southern regions must be play-off to finding one club joining last 12 clubs in group stage.

Sponsoring

Personnel
Note: Flags indicate national team as has been defined under FIFA eligibility rules. Players may hold more than one non-FIFA nationality.

Play-off round
Runners-up of Northern and Southern regions must be play-off to finding only 1 team qualifying to Thai League 4 champions league group stage. Because both regions have only 9 teams that less than all another regions.
Summary

|}

Matches

Group stage
The draw for the group stage was held on 12 September 2017, at the Sports Authority of Thailand (SAT) in Bangkok. The 12 teams were drawn to knock out stage, winners would advanced into two groups of three.

In each group, teams play against each other home-and-away in a round-robin format. The group winners, runners-up, and best third place promote to the 2018 Thai League 3.

First round

Knock out line A
Summary

|}

Matches

Chiangrai City won 6–5 on aggregate.

Chanthaburi won 4–3 on aggregate.

1–1 on aggregate. BTU United won 7–6 on penalties.

Knock out line B
Summary

|}

Matches

JL Chiangmai United won 5–1 on aggregate.

Muangkan United won 2–1 on aggregate.

2–2 on aggregate. Marines Eureka won on away goals.

Final round

Group A

Group B

The match JL Chiangmai United v Muangkan United, originally led 3–0 by JL Chiangmai United, was forfeited and awarded 2–0 to JL Chiangmai United by the FA Thailand on 10 October 2017, as Muangkan United's players had walked out during the match could continue playing after power failure has solved.

Ranking of third-placed teams
The best third-placed team would promoted to 2018 Thai League 3.
<noinclude>

Teams promoted to 2018 Thai League 3

 BTU United (Group A winners)
 JL Chiangmai United (Group B winners)
 Chiangrai City (Group A runners-up)
 Muangkan United (Group B runners-up)
 Marines Eureka (Best third-placed)

Goalscorers
5 goals

 Maryson Jone dos Santos (Chiangrai City)

4 goals

 Diego Oliveira Silva (BTU United)

3 goals

 Nantawat Tansopa (Chiangrai City)
 Chatri Rattanawong (Sisaket United)

2 goals

 Sitthinon Ketkaew (BTU United)
 Tirawut Thiwato (Chanthaburi)
 Chatchai Nakvijit (JL Chiangmai United)
 Pichet Hawkongkaew (JL Chiangmai United)
 Taku Ito (JL Chiangmai United)

1 goal

 Nattawut Namthip (BTU United)
 Teerapat Laksameearunothai (BTU United)
 Thierry Ratsimbazafy (BTU United)
 Nattapon Saiyasat (Chanthaburi)
 Nattawut Ngamthuan (Chanthaburi)
 Saknarin Pinjaikul (Chanthaburi)
 Chayanon Khamkan (Chiangrai City)
 Eakkanit Punya (Chiangrai City)
 Jetsada Supharit (Chiangrai City)
 Verdini (Chiangrai City)
 Kittipong Namsang (JL Chiangmai United)
 Tangeni Shipahu (JL Chiangmai United)
 Nattakarn Kaewkong (Marines Eureka)
 Noppadon Tornchuay (Marines Eureka)
 Ittipol Pol-arj (Mashare Chaiyaphum)
 Kelvin Amdonsah (Mashare Chaiyaphum)
 Watchara Ritkamlang (Mashare Chaiyaphum)
 Anuson Phamprasit (Muangkan United)
 Kedi Amang Ghislain Roger (Muangkan United)
 Pornthep Klaywongpung (Muangkan United)
 Chutchawal Nanteenpa (Muang Loei United)
 Poomipat Kantanet (North Bangkok University)
 Weerayut Jitkuntod (North Bangkok University)
 Nattapoom Maya (Phuket)
 Tevarit Junsom (Phuket)
 Gabriel Mintah (Samut Prakan)
 Phanuphong Aintachumpho (Sisaket United)
 Rattasak Wiang-in (Sisaket United)

Own goal

 Nattawat Wongsri (BTU United against Satun United)

References

Thai League T4 seasons
4